Vandans is a town located in the Bludenz district in the Austrian state of Vorarlberg. Located 650 m (2133 ft) above sea level, it is known for its skiing and hiking activities.

Population

Climate

References

External links
Planetware information on Vandans, Austria

Ski areas and resorts in Austria
Cities and towns in Bludenz District